José Antonio Mena Alfaro (born 2 February 1989) is a Costa Rican footballer who plays for Liga Nacional club Antigua as a defender.

Club career
In 2009, he debuted for Primera División de Costa Rica club Saprissa. On 5 September 2012, he moved to Municipal Pérez Zeledón on a one-year contract with an option to extend for a further year, but he left them in December 2012 for Thailand outfit Bangkok Glass. In August 2014 he terminated his contract with Bangkok focusing on his recovery from a broken foot.

He returned to Costa Rica in December 2014 to sign for Universidad.

International career
Mena played for the Costa Rica national football team at the 2009 FIFA U-20 World Cup in Egypt, where the team finished in fourth place.

On 1 June 2010 he made his senior debut for the Costa Rica national football team in a friendly match against Switzerland

Honours
Bangkok Glass
Thai FA Cup Runner-up (1): 2013

References

External links
 
 

1989 births
Living people
Footballers from San José, Costa Rica
Association football defenders
Costa Rican footballers
Costa Rican expatriate footballers
Costa Rica international footballers
Liga FPD players
Jose Mena
Liga Nacional de Fútbol de Guatemala players
Deportivo Saprissa players
Municipal Pérez Zeledón footballers
Jose Mena
C.F. Universidad de Costa Rica footballers
C.S. Herediano footballers
Antigua GFC players
2009 CONCACAF U-20 Championship players
Costa Rican expatriate sportspeople in Thailand
Costa Rican expatriate sportspeople in Guatemala
Expatriate footballers in Thailand
Expatriate footballers in Guatemala